Jo Han-sun (born June 17, 1981) is a South Korean actor. He made his debut in a beer commercial in 2001, then became a household name through the sitcom Nonstop 3 (2002) and the television drama April Kiss (2004). He is best known for the films Temptation of Wolves (2004), Cruel Winter Blues (2006), and A Better Tomorrow, the 2010 remake of the Hong Kong classic.

Filmography

Film

Television series

Variety show

Music video

Awards and nominations

Notes

References

External links
  
  
 Jo Han-sun at Mystic Story 
 
 
 

 

1981 births
Living people
21st-century South Korean male actors
South Korean male film actors
South Korean male television actors
Male actors from Seoul
Kakao M artists
Hongik University alumni